Bright Bakye Yelviel Baligi (born 3 May 1977) is a Ghanaian politician and member of the New Patriotic Party. He is the member of parliament for the Lambussie Constituency, Upper West Region.

Early life and education 
Baligi hails from Kpare. He hold a BSc in Agricultural Technology.

References 

Living people
Ghanaian MPs 2021–2025
People from Upper West Region
New Patriotic Party politicians
1977 births